The 2021 NBA Summer League was an off-season competition held by the National Basketball Association (NBA) at the Thomas and Mack Center and Cox Pavilion in Las Vegas, Nevada on the campus of University of Nevada, Las Vegas. The summer league consisted of the California Classic, Salt Lake City Summer League, and the Las Vegas NBA Summer League.

This was the first NBA Summer League since 2019 as the 2020 NBA Summer League was cancelled due to the ongoing COVID-19 pandemic, and due to the Bubble. It began on August 8, 2021, and ended on August 17. All 30 NBA teams participated in the reboot of the summer league. Teams competed in a tournament-style schedule in four preliminary games before seeding in a tournament; each team played four games, and the best two teams played in the championship, while the rest of the teams played another game the NBA decided on. The event concluded with the 2021 NBA Summer League Championship game on August 17.

California Classic 
The California Classic is an official summer league of the NBA—the third year it has been held. Four games were played at the Golden 1 Center on August 3 and 4.

Teams 

 Miami Heat
 Sacramento Kings
 Los Angeles Lakers
 Golden State Warriors

Day 1 
Note: Times are EDT (UTC−4) as listed by the NBA.

Day 2

Salt Lake City Summer League 
The Salt Lake City Summer League is an official summer league of the NBA—the sixth year it has been held. Six games were played in a round-robin format over the course of three days on August 3, 4, and 6 at the Vivint Smart Home Arena.

Teams 

 Memphis Grizzlies
 Utah Jazz (divided into a "white" and "blue" team)
 San Antonio Spurs

Day 1 
Note: Times are EDT (UTC−4) as listed by the NBA.

Day 2

Day 3

Las Vegas NBA Summer League 
The Las Vegas NBA Summer League is an official summer league of the NBA—the sixteenth year it has been held. 75 games are played between all 30 NBA teams from August 8 to 17. The league plays games across two venues: the Thomas and Mack Center and Cox Pavilion, both located in Paradise, Nevada (near Las Vegas). In the 2019 NBA Summer League, the Chinese and Croatian men's basketball teams participated in games, but they were not featured in the 2021 league.

Teams 

 Atlanta Hawks
 Boston Celtics
 Brooklyn Nets
 Chicago Bulls
 Cleveland Cavaliers
 Charlotte Hornets
 Dallas Mavericks
 Detroit Pistons
 Denver Nuggets
 Golden State Warriors
 Houston Rockets
 Indiana Pacers
 Los Angeles Clippers
 Los Angeles Lakers
 Memphis Grizzlies
 Miami Heat
 Milwaukee Bucks
 Minnesota Timberwolves
 New Orleans Pelicans
 New York Knicks
 Oklahoma City Thunder
 Orlando Magic
 Philadelphia 76ers
 Phoenix Suns
 Portland Trail Blazers
 Sacramento Kings
 San Antonio Spurs
 Toronto Raptors
 Utah Jazz
 Washington Wizards

Day 1 
Note: Times are EDT (UTC−4) as listed by the NBA.

Day 2 
Day 3

Day 3

References 

Summer League
2021
2021–22 in American basketball by league
2021 in sports in Nevada
July 2021 sports events in the United States